Justus Brinckmann (23 May 1843 – 8 February 1915) was the first director of the Museum für Kunst und Gewerbe in Hamburg.

Selected publications
 Kunst und Kunstgewerbe in Japan. 1883  (Vortrag von 1882 im Verein für Kunst und Wissenschaft zu Hamburg)
 Kunst und Handwerk in Japan. Wagner, Berlin 1889 (Neuauflage: BiblioBazaar, 2010)
 Führer durch das Hamburger Museum für Kunst und Gewerbe. 2 Bände. Verlag des Museums für Kunst und Gewerbe 1894
 Band I: Hamburgische Ofen, Korbflechtarbeiten, Gewebe, Stickereien, Spitzen, Lederarbeiten, architektonische Ornamente, ostasiatische Metallarbeiten, europäische Edelschmiedearbeiten, Email, Keramik des Altertums, Deutsches Steinzeug, Fayencen.
Band II: 2 Europäisches Porzellan u. Steingut, westasiatische Fayencen, chinesisches Porzellan, japanische Töpferarbeiten, Glas, Möbel, Bauschreinerarbeiten, Holzschnitzereien, Uhren, Elfenbeinarbeiten, Zinnarbeiten wissenschaftliche Instrumente u.a.
 Kenzan, Beiträge zur Geschichte der japanischen Töpferkunst. In: Jahrbuch der Hamburgischen Wissenschaftlichen Anstalten. XIV. Jahrgang 1896. Lucas Gräfe & Silleni, Hamburg 1897
 Die Ankäufe auf der Weltausstellung Paris. 1900. Hrsg. vom Hamburgischen Museum für Kunst und Gewerbe. Lütcke & Wulff Hamburg 1901
 Hrsg.: Berichte des Museums für Kunst und Gewerbe, 1883–1910. In: Jahrbuch der Hamburgischen Wissenschaftlichen Anstalten

References

External links 

 

1843 births
1915 deaths
German art historians